Giulio Cesare Viancini (19 August 1726 – 22 October 1797) was the elected Archbishop of Sassari.

References 

1726 births
1797 deaths
18th-century Italian Roman Catholic archbishops
Archbishops of Sassari